A Turkish march—in Italian, marcia alla turca—is a march written by a classical composer in the Turkish style that includes particular rhythmic patterns and often features piccolos, cymbals, bass drums and triangles.

Turkish March may refer to the following specific pieces of classical music:
 Turkish Rondo, or Rondo alla turca, the third movement from Wolfgang Amadeus Mozart's Piano Sonata No. 11, K. 331 (1783)
 Turkish March (Beethoven), from Ludwig van Beethoven's Six Variations, Op. 76 (1809), which he re-used as the fourth movement in the 1811 incidental music The Ruins of Athens, Op. 113
 A section in the style of a Turkish march from the last movement of Beethoven's Symphony No. 9, Op. 125 (1824)